
The Narina trogon (Apaloderma narina) is a largely green and red, medium-sized (32–34 cm long), bird of the family Trogonidae. It is native to forests and woodlands of the Afrotropics. Though it is the most widespread and catholic in habitat choice of the three Apaloderma species, their numbers are locally depleted due to deforestation. Some populations are sedentary while others undertake regular movements. The species name commemorates Narina, mistress of French ornithologist François Levaillant, whose name he derived from a Khoikhoi word for "flower", as her given name was difficult to pronounce.

Description

It is sexually dimorphic, with males more brightly coloured. Both sexes have vivid, gingery green upperpart plumage. The tail feathers have a metallic blue-green gloss. The outer three rectices on each side are tipped and fringed white, giving the undertail of perched birds a characteristic white appearance (compare bar-tailed trogon). The wing coverts are a grizzled grey, and remiges mostly colourless grey.

The male especially, has bright amaranth red underside plumage and bare, green gape and eye flanges. The female has brown face and chest plumage, blue skin orbiting the eyes and duller red plumage below. Immature birds resemble females, but have distinct white tips to the tertials (inner wing), and less distinct gape and eye flanges.

Range and habitat
The species has a large range in Africa, inhabiting lowland to highland, valley and riparian forests, from tropical to temperate regions, those occurring in highlands dispersing seasonally to lower levels. It is found from Sierra Leone to Ethiopia, and east Africa to eastern and southern South Africa. Due to its wide range and varied habitat choice, the Narina trogon is considered to be a species of least conservation concern.

Habits and nesting
The diet consists mainly of insects and small invertebrates as well as rodents and small reptiles. The call is a grating, low repeated hoot, given by males only, in defending territory or attracting mates. The male's bare, blue-green throat patch is expanded when calling and both sexes may fluff out the breast feathers in display. They nest in a tree hollow in which both sexes incubate or brood.

Races

There are 4 to 6 accepted races:
 A. n. subsp. constantia Sharpe & Ussher, 1872
Range: Senegal to Nigeria
 A. n. subsp. arcanum Clancey, 1959
Range: Chad to n Kenya
 A. n. subsp. brachyurum Chapin, 1923
Range: s Cameroon to Rift Valley
 A. n. subsp. littorale van Someren, 1931 – Type from Sokoke Forest
Range: Somalia to Chirinda Forest, Zimbabwe
 A. n. subsp. rufiventre A.J.C.Dubois, 1897 – Type from Mpala, DRC
Range: s DRC to s Uganda, Tanzania, Malawi, Namibia, Botswana and Zambia to Eastern Highlands
 A. n. subsp. narina (Stephens, 1815) – Type from Knysna, South Africa
Range: South Africa to s Mozambique, winters northwards to Malawi

References

External links
 BirdLife Species Factsheet
 Narina trogon - Species text in The Atlas of Southern African Birds.

Narina trogon
Birds of Sub-Saharan Africa
Narina trogon